Power Struggle (2011) was a professional wrestling pay-per-view (PPV) event promoted by New Japan Pro-Wrestling (NJPW). The event took place on November 12, 2011, in Osaka, Osaka, at the Osaka Prefectural Gymnasium and featured eleven matches, five of which were contested for championships. It was the first event under the Power Struggle name.

Storylines
Power Struggle featured eleven professional wrestling matches that involved different wrestlers from pre-existing scripted feuds and storylines. Wrestlers portrayed villains, heroes, or less distinguishable characters in the scripted events that built tension and culminated in a wrestling match or series of matches.

Event
During the event all five champions were successful in their defenses. Davey Richards, one half of the No Remorse Corps, who successfully defended the IWGP Junior Heavyweight Tag Team Championship against Kushida and Tiger Mask, challenged Prince Devitt, after he had successfully defended the IWGP Junior Heavyweight Championship against Taka Michinoku, to a future title match. The match took place on December 4 and saw Devitt emerge victorious. The semi-main event saw Bad Intentions (Giant Bernard and Karl Anderson) make their tenth successful defense of the IWGP Tag Team Championship against Suzuki-gun representatives Lance Archer and Minoru Suzuki. This would turn out to be the final successful defense of the team, which set the record not only for most defenses, but also the longest reign. In the main event, Hiroshi Tanahashi defeated Toru Yano for his ninth successful defense of the IWGP Heavyweight Championship, regaining possession of the title belt, which had been stolen by Yano.

Results

References

External links
The official New Japan Pro-Wrestling website

2011
2011 in professional wrestling
November 2011 events in Japan
Professional wrestling in Osaka
Events in Osaka